Nathaniel Shio Hong Wan (born 17 August 2000), commonly known as Hong Wan, is a professional footballer who plays as a midfielder for Malaysia Super League side Johor Darul Ta'zim.

Early life 
Hong Wan was born to a Malaysian mother and an English-Chinese father in Croydon, England. His mother is from Tangkak, Johor, Malaysia while his father was born in Beihai, Guangxi, China.

He started playing football when he was two-and-a-half years old, and was scouted by Arsenal, Charlton and Crystal Palace in his first tournament. He joined Charlton Athletic Academy at the age of six.

Club career
Hong Wan came through the academy of Charlton Athletic, before joining Yeovil Town in 2017. He was the captain of the under-18 squad, however, he failed to make a senior appearance for the club.

In 2019, Hong Wan signed for Wolverhampton Wanderers on a permanent deal. In July 2019, he joined the senior team for a friendly tournament in China, Premier League Asia Trophy. Wolves won the tournament with Hong Wan playing two matches against Newcastle United and Manchester City.

In early 2020, he was loaned to Croatian side Varaždin, but made no senior appearances due to the COVID-19 pandemic before returning to Wolves four months later. Despite failing to make any Premier League appearance for Wolves, he managed to make 21 appearances for the club's under-23 team in the 2020–21 Premier League 2 Division 2.

On 30 June 2021, Hong Wan joined Malaysia Super League side Johor Darul Ta'zim on a free transfer, because he saw it as an opportunity to develop as a player and play at a high level. He made his competitive debut with JDT in the 2022 Piala Sumbangsih, the Malaysian super cup competition, coming on as a 90th-minute substitute. On 4 March 2022, Hong Wan made his league debut in the first round of the 2022 Malaysia Super League against Penang.

International career
Due to his place of birth and parents' origin, Hong Wan is eligible to represent England, Malaysia, and China internationally.

In March 2022, he was called up to the Malaysia national football team training camp, ahead of friendly matches against the Philippines, Singapore, and Albirex Niigata Singapore. However, he did not make it to the final 25-man squad due to lack of fitness.

Personal life 
Hong Wan's father moved from China to England at the young age and his mother moved to England from Malaysia in her twenties to pursue her studies.

Hong Wan received his Malaysian passport and identity card in 2021 after joining Johor Darul Ta'zim.

Career statistics

Honours 
Johor Darul Ta'zim
 Malaysia Super League: 2022
 Malaysia Cup: 2022
 Malaysia FA Cup: 2022
 Piala Sumbangsih: 2022, 2023

Notes

References

2000 births
Living people
People from Croydon
English footballers
Malaysian footballers
Association football midfielders
Wolverhampton Wanderers F.C. players
NK Varaždin (2012) players
Johor Darul Ta'zim F.C. players
English expatriate footballers
English expatriate sportspeople in Croatia
Expatriate footballers in Croatia
Malaysia Super League players